My Favorite Duck is a 1942 color Warner Bros. Looney Tunes cartoon directed by Chuck Jones, in his second collaboration with writer Michael Maltese. The cartoon was released on December 5, 1942, and stars Daffy Duck and Porky Pig. It was the second color entry in the Looney Tunes series, and the first pairing of Porky and Daffy produced in Technicolor.

The title was presumably inspired by a film of that era, either My Favorite Wife (1940) or My Favorite Blonde (1942). In this case the title is used ironically. This is one of several entries in a series where Daffy (during his "screwball" period) torments Porky in a variety of ways.

Plot
Porky is on a camping vacation beside a lake where Daffy happens to live. The duck quickly insinuates himself into Porky's attempts at relaxation, and every time the duck gets Porky riled enough to threaten violence, Daffy shows him a sign that says it is not duck hunting season, and that there is a hefty fine for even "molesting" (i.e. "bothering") a duck. When Porky calls Daffy screwy, Daffy makes eyes with Porky and responds "That, my little cherub, is strictly a matter of opinion".

Porky and Daffy both sing to different effect. Porky, who has trouble with words starting with M and B (among others), stammers and stutters his way through the standard "On Moonlight Bay" from 1912, while Daffy periodically breaks into a somewhat-sultry version of a then-recent hit called "Blues in the Night." At one point, Porky unconsciously starts to sing Daffy's number, then stops, looks into the camera with a "Harumph!" and returns to "Moonlight Bay".

Daffy is able to get away with a lot, "Hoo-hooing" after every gag, until near the end, when a new sign says duck hunting season is now open, and it even specifically invites shooting this duck. The tables have turned dramatically, and Porky gets his revenge. While Porky chases Daffy around a tree, the picture gets out of order and breaks, then Daffy appears saying "Ladies and gentlemen, due to circumstances beyond our control, we are unable to continue this picture. But don't worry, I'll tell  you how it came out." The duck asides to the audience that he beat up Porky. A hook whisks Daffy offscreen and a loud smashing sound is heard. Porky then drags the dazed duck across the screen, his shotgun now bent in the form of Daffy's head.

Production notes
The song, "Blues in the Night" (Music by Harold Arlen; lyrics by Johnny Mercer) is perhaps better known as "My Mama Done Tol' Me When I Was in Kneepants" and is from the 1941 Warner Bros. film, Blues in the Night. The song had been recently nominated as the Best Song Oscar for Warner Bros. shortly before My Favorite Duck was released.

Home media
The short appears in its entirety in the documentary Bugs Bunny: Superstar, Part 2, which is available as a special feature on Disc 2 of the Looney Tunes Golden Collection: Volume 4. It is also available fully restored on Disc 1 of the Looney Tunes Golden Collection: Volume 6.

See also
 Looney Tunes and Merrie Melodies filmography (1940–1949)

References

External links
 
 

1942 animated films
1942 films
Looney Tunes shorts
Warner Bros. Cartoons animated short films
Short films directed by Chuck Jones
Daffy Duck films
Porky Pig films
Films scored by Carl Stalling
Vitaphone short films
Self-reflexive films
1940s Warner Bros. animated short films
Films with screenplays by Michael Maltese
Films about vacationing
1940s English-language films